The 2016 West Virginia Mountaineers football team represented West Virginia University in the 2016 NCAA Division I FBS football season. The Mountaineers played as members of the Big 12 Conference (Big 12) and were led by head coach Dana Holgorsen, in his sixth year. West Virginia played its home games at Mountaineer Field at Milan Puskar Stadium in Morgantown, West Virginia. 2016 was the 125th season of West Virginia football. They finished the season 10–3, 7–2 in Big 12 play to finished in a tie for second place. They received an invitation to the Russell Athletic Bowl where they lost to Miami.

Preseason

Big 12 media poll
The 2016 Big 12 media days were held July 18–19, 2016 in Dallas, Texas. In the Big 12 preseason media poll, West Virginia was predicted to finish seventh in the standings.

Schedule
West Virginia announced its 2016 football schedule on November 24, 2015. The 2016 schedule consists of 7 home, 4 away, and 1 neutral site game in the regular season. The Mountaineers will host Big 12 foes Baylor, Kansas, Kansas State, Oklahoma, and TCU, and will travel to Iowa State, Oklahoma State, Texas, and Texas Tech.

The team will play three non–conference games, two home games against the Missouri Tigers from the Southeastern Conference (SEC) and Youngstown State Penguins from the Missouri Valley Football Conference, and one neutral site game which is against the BYU Cougars at FedExField in Landover, Maryland.

Schedule Source:

Game summaries

Missouri

Youngstown State

vs. BYU

Kansas State

at Texas Tech

TCU

at Oklahoma State

Kansas

at Texas

Oklahoma

at Iowa State

Baylor

Miami (FL) – Russell Athletic Bowl

Rankings

References

West Virginia
West Virginia Mountaineers football seasons
West Virginia Mountaineers football